Arturo Álvarez Perea (born October 18, 1959) was a Mexican first division player, who played most of his career with Puebla F.C. where he appeared in 346 first division games besides the Copa México and international appearances and also won the 1982–83 and 1989–90 first division titles. He began his career in  1977–78 with  Atlante where he spent one year before playing with Puebla F.C. where he played for almost 15 years. He also spent two years out on loan from Puebla F.C. first in 1987–1988 tournament when he played for Cruz Azul and also in 1992–1993 tournament when he played for Club América where he only played in 8 games.

Achievements

External links
 
 
 mediotiempo.com

1959 births
Living people
Mexican footballers
Atlante F.C. footballers
Club Puebla players
Cruz Azul footballers
Club América footballers
Association football defenders